Hutton is a lunar impact crater on the far side of the Moon. It lies to the northwest of the larger crater Shayn, and to the north of Nušl.

Hutton is a worn, circular crater with a largely symmetrical appearance. Its features include a small craterlet across the western rim, some slight disruption to the northern rim, and an eroded, ledge-like form along the southern inner wall. The interior floor has an elongated central ridge at the midpoint, and a smaller ridge offset to the east, but it is otherwise marked only by tiny craterlets and a few small hills.

Satellite craters

By convention these features are identified on lunar maps by placing the letter on the side of the crater midpoint that is closest to Hutton.

References

 
 
 
 
 
 
 
 
 
 
 
 

Impact craters on the Moon